Michelle Morton (born 11 June 1972) is a Canadian speed skater. She competed at the 1994 Winter Olympics and the 1998 Winter Olympics.

References

External links
 

1972 births
Living people
Canadian female speed skaters
Olympic speed skaters of Canada
Speed skaters at the 1994 Winter Olympics
Speed skaters at the 1998 Winter Olympics
Speed skaters from Calgary